Guilford Center Presbyterian Church is a historic Presbyterian church on County Road 36 in Guilford Center, Chenango County, New York. It was built in 1817 and is a large -story rectangular wood-frame building, five bays long and three bays wide.  It is built into the side of a hill on a cut-stone foundation.  It features a three-stage tower with a spire.

It was added to the National Register of Historic Places in 2004.

References

Presbyterian churches in New York (state)
Churches on the National Register of Historic Places in New York (state)
Churches completed in 1817
19th-century Presbyterian church buildings in the United States
Churches in Chenango County, New York
National Register of Historic Places in Chenango County, New York
Greek Revival church buildings in New York (state)